West Dalhousie is a community in the Canadian province of Nova Scotia, located in  Annapolis County. It is named after George Ramsay, 9th Earl of Dalhousie.

References

Communities in Annapolis County, Nova Scotia